Lieselotte "Lilo" Fürst-Ramdohr (11 October 1913 – 13 May 2013) was a member of the Munich branch of the student resistance group White Rose (Weiße Rose) in Nazi Germany. She was born in Aschersleben.

Early life 
Ramdohr was a descendant of a merchant family from Aschersleben. After half a year in England and one year at the boarding school of Fritz Weiß in Weimar where her long year friendship with Falk Harnack began, she moved to Munich in 1934 to become a stage designer. From March 1935 to February 1936, she learned book illustration at the Württembergische Kunstgewerbeschule in Stuttgart. In 1936, she moved to Dresden to attend dance school until the Nazis closed it. Ramdohr switched to a state-run school in Stuttgart, and later ran a private school in Heilbronn. She eventually married Otto Berndl, son of a Bavarian architect. Her religious preference was Lutheran.

The White Rose 
In the autumn of 1941, she befriended Alexander Schmorell, Christoph Probst and Hans Scholl, and later Traute Lafrenz, Sophie Scholl and Willi Graf. After her husband was killed in Russia in May 1942, she began storing documents and a duplication apparatus in her flat in Neuhausen-Nymphenburg. In November 1942, she expanded the group's underground activities by joining forces with more powerful groups in Berlin such as the Kreisauer Kreis and the Christian resistance leader Dietrich Bonhoeffer through the help of Falk Harnack.

Escape from Munich 
On 2 March 1943 Ramdohr was arrested, but was released for lack of evidence.
Later that month, Heinrich Himmler ordered her arrested again and sentenced to death, but she managed to escape. Ramdohr married German-born, Brazilian-raised medical student Carl Gebhard Fürst (1920–2010) in February 1944 in Munich, and escaped to her hometown of Aschersleben, using the name Lieselotte Fürst.

Post-war era 
Ramdohr survived the war and in 1948 fled with her four-year-old daughter, Doma-Ulrike, out of the Soviet occupation zone back to Bavaria, where she became a sports instructor in boarding schools in Upper Bavaria. In 1995, she published her memoirs "Friendships in the White Rose". Up until her death, she lived in a small town outside Munich. The BBC described her as a "spry 99-year-old".

Documentaries 
 In 1996, Bavarian Broadcasting, BR, televised a biography of Ramdohr as a part of its series Lebenslinien. The director was Hans-Sirks Lampe.
 In 1995, Geschichtswerkstatt Neuhausen televised interviews with Ramdohr in the documentary Davon haben wir nichts gewusst...Neuhausen unter der Nazi-Zeit.
 In 2008, interviews with Ramdohr were featured in the documentary Die Widerständigen – Zeugen der Weißen Rose.

Works by Lilo Fürst-Ramdohr 
 Freundschaften in der Weißen Rose. Verlag Geschichtswerkstatt Neuhausen, Munich 1995, 
 Die Weiße Rose (by Inge Scholl); p. 139. Frankfurt/M. 1994, 
 Seiltanz (Lyrics of the Munich Catacombe); Ed. Nanette Bald, Roman Kovar, Munich 1991.

References

Further reading 
 Bassler, Sibylle: Die Weiße Rose, Zeitzeugen erinnern sich. Rowohlt, Reinbek near Hamburg 2006. .
 Dumbach, Annette & Newborn, Jud. "Sophie Scholl & The White Rose". Oneworld Publications, 2007. . Page 95, 149.
 Ruth H. Sachs: White Rose History, Volume I [Academic Version]: Coming Together (January 31, 1933 – April 30, 1942). Exclamation! Publishers, Lehi (Utah, USA) 2003. .
 Die Weiße Rose – Gesichter einer Freundschaft (Brochure by Kulturinitiative e.V. Freiburg; S. 12)
 Shareen Blair Brysac: Resisting Hitler. Mildred Harnack and the Red Orchestra. Oxford University Press 2000. 
 Barry Pree: White Rose. Trinity Press International 1999. 
 Corina L. Petrescu: Allen Gewalten zum Trutz sich erhalten": models of subversive spaces in National Socialist Germany University of Wisconsin-Madison, 2006, p. 149 et seq.

External links 
 Lilo Ramdohr's biography
 
 English version of Friendships in the White Rose by Lilo Ramdohr, unpublished
 Discussion of Lilo Ramdohr's historical role by Katrin Seybold
 On-line version of 'Die Weiße Rose' by Inge Scholl
 Abstract of 'Die Widerständigen', cf. p. 14: Essay on Lilo Ramdohr (PDF-file in German; 3,93 MB)
 Article about Lilo Ramdohr being the fiancée of Falk Harnack
 
 Sabine Bader, "Die Überlebende der "Weißen Rose" Süddeutsche Zeitung (May 9, 2011). Retrieved February 16, 2012 
 BBC World Service: episode of Witness broadcast on February 22, 2013.

1913 births
2013 deaths
German anti-fascists
German female dancers
German people of World War II
History of Munich
Ludwig Maximilian University of Munich
People condemned by Nazi courts
White Rose members
Lutheran pacifists
Recipients of the Cross of the Order of Merit of the Federal Republic of Germany
20th-century Lutherans
20th-century German women